Quinary  (base-5 or pental) is a numeral system with five as the base. A possible origination of a quinary system is that there are five digits on either hand.

In the quinary place system, five numerals, from 0 to 4, are used to represent any real number. According to this method, five is written as 10, twenty-five is written as 100 and sixty is written as 220.

As five is a prime number, only the reciprocals of the powers of five terminate, although its location between two highly composite numbers (4 and 6) guarantees that many recurring fractions have relatively short periods.

Today, the main usage of base 5 is as a biquinary system, which is decimal using five as a sub-base. Another example of a sub-base system, is sexagesimal, base 60, which used 10 as a sub-base.

Each quinary digit can hold log25 (approx. 2.32) bits of information.

Comparison to other radices

Usage
Many languages use quinary number systems, including Gumatj, Nunggubuyu, Kuurn Kopan Noot, Luiseño and Saraveca.  Gumatj has been reported to be a true "5–25" language, in which 25 is the higher group of 5. The Gumatj numerals are shown below:

However, Harald Hammarström reports "one would not usually use exact numbers for counting this high in this language and there is a certain likelihood that the system was extended this high only at the time of elicitation with one single speaker", pointing to the Biwat language as a similar case (previously attested as 5-20, but with one speaker recorded as making an innovation to turn it 5-25).

Biquinary

A decimal system with 2 and 5 as a sub-bases is called biquinary, and is found in Wolof and Khmer. Roman numerals are an early biquinary system. The numbers 1, 5, 10, and 50 are written as I, V, X, and L respectively. Seven is VII and seventy is LXX. The full list is:

Note that these are not positional number systems. In theory a number such as 73 could be written as IIIXXL without ambiguity as well as LXXIII and it is still not possible to extend it beyond thousands. There is also no sign for zero. But with the introduction of inversions such as IV and IX, it was necessary to keep the order from most to least significant.

Many versions of the abacus, such as the suanpan and soroban, use a biquinary system to simulate a decimal system for ease of calculation. Urnfield culture numerals and some tally mark systems are also biquinary. Units of currencies are commonly partially or wholly biquinary.

Bi-quinary coded decimal is a variant of biquinary that was used on a number of early computers including Colossus and the IBM 650 to represent decimal numbers.

Quadquinary
A vigesimal system with 4 and 5 as a sub-bases is found in Nahuatl.

Calculators and programming languages
Few calculators support calculations in the quinary system, except for some Sharp models (including some of the EL-500W and EL-500X series, where it is named the pental system) since about 2005, as well as the open-source scientific calculator WP 34S. 

Python's int() function supports conversion of numeral systems from any base to base 10. Thus, the quinary number 101 is evaluated using int('101',5) as 26.

See also

Quibinary
Bi-quinary coded decimal

References

External links 
 Quinary Base Conversion, includes fractional part, from Math Is Fun
 
 Quinary-pentavigesimal and decimal calculator, uses D'ni numerals from the Myst franchise, integers only, fan-made.

Positional numeral systems
5 (number)